Toshiyuki Adachi is a Japanese politician who has served as a member of the House of Councillors of Japan, since 2016. He represents the National proportional representation block. He currently serves on the following committees:

 Committee on Land and Transport (Director)
 Special Committee on Disasters (Director)
 Research Committee on National Life and Economy
 Committee on Audit

Early life 
Adachi was born on May 20, 1954, in the Hyogo Prefecture of Japan. He graduated from Kyoto University in 1977 with a degree in engineering, and earned a graduate degree in engineering from that same university in 1979.

Career 
Prior to his election to the House of Councillors, Adachi worked in the Ministry of Construction (now called Ministry of Land, Infrastructure, Transport and Tourism or MLIT). A summary of his career is presented below:

 1979–2002: Engineer in MLIT
 2002–2003: Counsellor for emergency national security and emergency legislation in the Cabinet.
 2003–2006: Director of Planning Department of the Kinki (Kansai) branch of MLIT.
 2006–2009: Director of River Planning Division of the River Bureau of MLIT.
 2009–2011: Director of the Shikoku branch of MLIT.
 2011–2012: Director of the Chubu branch of MLIT.
 2012–2013: Director of the Water and Disaster Management Bureau of MLIT.
 2013–2016: Vice-Minister for Engineering Affairs of MLIT

In 2016, he was elected to the House of Councillors.

References 

Japanese politicians
1954 births
Living people